The Cabanon de vacances is a vacation home designed and built by noted architect Le Corbusier in 1951. It is the only place the architect Le Corbusier built for himself which he used for vacation. In July 2016, the home and sixteen other works by Le Corbusier were inscribed as the world's smallest UNESCO World Heritage Sites. It was built exclusively for himself,  as a seaside escape away from Parisian city life, Le Corbusier spent every August in the cabin for 14 years. The cabin is constructed out of wood logs. Le Corbusier loved his summer home for its location.

References

External links

 Official website

Le Corbusier buildings in France
Houses in Alpes-Maritimes
Houses completed in 1951
Modernist architecture in France